Yusuf Barası (born 31 March 2003) is a footballer who plays as a forward for AZ Alkmaar. Born in the Netherlands, Barası represents Turkey internationally.

International career
Born in the Netherlands, Barası is of Turkish descent. He is a youth international for the Netherlands. Barası switched to represent the  Turkey U21s, and debuted with them in a 3-0 win over Kosovo U21 on 17 November 2020.

Career statistics

Club

References

2003 births
Living people
Dutch people of Turkish descent
Sportspeople from Alkmaar
Turkish footballers
Dutch footballers
Footballers from North Holland
Association football forwards
Turkey youth international footballers
Netherlands youth international footballers
Eerste Divisie players
Eredivisie players
AZ Alkmaar players
Jong AZ players